Carl Buell Close, Sr. (October 17, 1907 – December 28, 1980), was a Democratic politician from Alexandria, Louisiana, who served as a member of the Louisiana House of Representatives from 1944 to 1947, when he stepped down to become the mayor of his adopted city of Alexandria, a post he held until 1953.

Early life
Close was one of six children of a country physician, Edgar Close (1871-1948), originally from Carbondale in southern Illinois, and the former Mary Louvenia Patton (1873-1948), a native of Harrison in Boone County in northwestern Arkansas. Close was born in rural Robertsville near Morrilton in Conway County in north central Arkansas.

Personal life
Edgar and Mary Close married in 1891 and died in 1948 some eight months apart. In 1935, Carl Close married Sarah Ella Jordan (1907-1959) of Atkins in Pope County, Arkansas. Their  son and only child, Carl Close, Jr., was born in 1936 in New Orleans. The junior Close graduated from Bolton High School in Alexandria and Louisiana Tech University in Ruston, was an officer in the United States Air Force, and worked as data processing specialist in Alexandria, where he died in 2000 at the age of sixty-three. Close, Sr., subsequently married the former Ilie Jewel Willis (1907-1995).

Political career

Close served in the House during the administration of Governor Jimmie Davis alongside the two other at-large representatives from Rapides Parish, John R. Hunter, Jr., and C. H. "Sammy" Downs, later a state senator and a gubernatorial aide under John J. McKeithen. Close became mayor halfway into an unexpired term. He served with Commissioners Ben F. Bradford and W. H. Smith, who like Close was a former state representative. In 1948, Close attracted attention by discounting the debilitating effects of a drought in Central Louisiana. Two weeks later,  W. W. Thomas at the municipal airport seeded a cloud with forty pounds of dry ice. Soon .85 of an inch of rainfall followed. In 1949, Close won a full term as the mayor.
 
Oddly, Close was succeeded in the House and as mayor by the same man, his fellow Democrat, W. George Bowdon, Jr., who held the mayoralty for sixteen years until his third-place finish in the 1969 Democratic primary. Ed Karst then defeated John K. Snyder for the position. Close, Bowdon, Karst, and Karst's successor, John K. Snyder, all served under the former city commission system, which was superseded in 1977 by the mayor-council home rule charter. Carroll E. Lanier in the spring of 1977 became the first mayor under the mayor-council government.
 
Close died in Alexandria at the age of seventy-three. He is interred at Forest Lawn Memorial Park near Pineville, along with his first wife and son. His daughter-in-law, Betty Anne Reeves Close (born 1937) of Alexandria, and two grandsons survive.

References

1907 births
1980 deaths
Democratic Party members of the Louisiana House of Representatives
Mayors of Alexandria, Louisiana
People from Morrilton, Arkansas
20th-century American politicians